A headnote is a brief summary of a particular point of law that is added to the text of a court decision to aid readers in locating discussion of a legal issue in an opinion. As the term implies, headnotes appear at the beginning of the published opinion.

In 1906, the Supreme Court of the United States ruled in United States v. Detroit Timber & Lumber Co. that headnotes have no legal standing and therefore do not set precedent.

See also

 Case law

References

Judicial legal terminology
American legal terminology